Maria da Assunção Andrade Esteves (born October 15, 1956) is a Portuguese politician who was President of the Assembly of the Republic of Portugal from 2011 to 2015. She was a Member of the European Parliament for the Social Democratic Party–People's Party coalition, part of the European People's Party–European Democrats group, from 2004 to 2009.

Life and career
Born in Valpaços, Valpaços, Assunção Esteves holds both a bachelor's degree and a master's degree in law from the Faculty of Law of the University of Lisbon, where she was an assistant between 1989 and 1999. During that time, she was also a Justice of the Portuguese Constitutional Court from 1989 to 1998.

On 21 June 2011 she became the first female President of the Assembly of the Republic. At the time, being unable to receive both her salary of €5,219.15 as President of the Assembly and her retirement pension of €7,255, which she started receiving at the age of 42, for having been a Justice of the Portuguese Constitutional Court, she chose to keep her retirement pension. Additionally, she received €2,133 for work expenses.

Honours
  Grand-Cross of the Order of the Sun, Peru (26 July 2013)
  Sash of the Order of the Aztec Eagle, Mexico (17 August 2015)
  Grand-Cross of the Order of Christ, Portugal (11 November 2015)

References

External links

1956 births
Living people
MEPs for Portugal 2004–2009
21st-century women MEPs for Portugal
Social Democratic Party (Portugal) MEPs
Presidents of the Assembly of the Republic (Portugal)
Women members of the Assembly of the Republic (Portugal)
Members of the Assembly of the Republic (Portugal)
People from Valpaços